Eric Etebari (born December 5, 1969) is an Iranian-American actor, model and musician. He appeared in Witchblade, 2 Fast 2 Furious and Lincoln Lawyer.  He is also known for his portrayal of Dallas in the video game PAYDAY 2.

Early life and education
Raised by his mother, photo/artist Jean Ferro in Hollywood, in an artist community, Etebari's first taste of acting came in seventh grade from the Francis Ford Coppola Magnet school program at Bankcroft Jr. High School. He spent the ensuing years at Santa Monica High School where he excelled in sports; playing football, baseball and basketball. He subsequently landed a volleyball scholarship to San Diego State University. While at the SDSU, he was awarded the Commendation of Honor by the San Diego Fire Department for his valor in saving two women from a burning apartment.

Career
After college, he had the opportunity to work with Bruce Weber, which launched his modeling career and also landed a Versace advertising campaign. This ad campaign afforded Etebari the opportunity to also work with Richard Avedon. While in Europe he worked with Karl Lagerfeld and Robert Fleischauer; he also worked on his own cologne campaign, “Zino” Cologne for Men by Davidoff. Additionally, he has appeared in a successful series of commercials with Director Michael Bay, including the “Bongo Jean” commercial with Liv Tyler. After attending intense acting workshops for several years, he did several guest spots and independent films before being cast to play Ian Nottingham in the Warner Brothers/TNT movie of the week, Witchblade, which led to two seasons as a series regular.

In 2003, Etebari appeared in 2 Fast 2 Furious, racing the classic 1970 Dodge Challenger. He next had a role in the September 2004 release of Cellular, directed by David R. Ellis.

Filmography
 2000 Witchblade (TV film) as Ian Nottingham
 2001-2002 Witchblade (TV series) as Ian Nottingham
 2002 The Honorable as Junior Lopez
 2003 2 Fast 2 Furious (2003) as U.S. Customs Agent Darden
 2004 Cellular as Detective Dmitri
 2011 The Lincoln Lawyer as Charles Talbot
 2012 Stand Up Guys as Billy, The Bartender
 2013 Payday: The Web Series as Nathan Steele / Dallas
 2014 Walk of Shame as Denise's bad date guy
 2020 Alone as Jack Brian
 2021 Boss Level as Roy #2

Notable TV guest appearances
 1993 Zino by Davidoff - commercial circa
 1996 Silk Stalkings episode: "Partners in Crime"(episode # 6.9) as Jeff Turner
 1997 413 Hope St. episode: "Redemption" (episode # 1.4) as Unknown
 1998 Acapulco H.E.A.T. episode: "Code Name: Mr. Paradise" (episode # 1.7) as Unknown
 2003 Line of Fire episode: "Mockingbird" (episode # 1.4) as Jesse Sherwood
 2006 Ford Fusion Commercial
 2006 CSI: Miami episode: "Driven" as Javier Morena
 2007 American Heiress 41 episodes as Fake Carlos
 2011 Glee as Reggie 'The Sauce' Salazar (voice)
 2012 NCIS: Los Angeles as Rinaldo 'The Crimeleon' Maggio
 2014 Castle episode: "Law & Boarder" (episode # 6.21) as Enver Kotta
 2021 Narcos: Mexico: Jack Dorian, 4 episodes

Producing and directing
 2005 Sorrows Lost (Short) as Producer.
 2010 Bare Knuckles as Producer and Director.
 2012 Hood (Short) as Producer.
 2020 Emerald Run as Director.

External links
Official site.
Dragon*Con Biography of Eric Etebari

Official Facebook Page
Catfight Report Exclusive Interview - Eric Etebari

1969 births
American male actors
Living people